The aftermath of the 2011 Tōhoku earthquake and tsunami included both a humanitarian crisis and massive economic impacts. The tsunami created over 300,000 refugees in the Tōhoku region of Japan, and resulted in shortages of food, water, shelter, medicine and fuel for survivors. 15,900 deaths have been confirmed. In response to the crisis, the Japanese government mobilized the Self-Defence Forces, while many countries sent search and rescue teams to help search for survivors. Aid organizations both in Japan and worldwide also responded, with the Japanese Red Cross reporting $1 billion in donations. The economic impact included both immediate problems, with industrial production suspended in many factories, and the longer term issue of the cost of rebuilding which has been estimated at ¥10 trillion ($122 billion USD).

A further serious impact of the tsunami was the critical damage done to the Fukushima Daiichi Nuclear Power Plant, resulting in severe releases of radioactivity and the prospect of a long-term health and environmental hazard in need of an expensive clean-up.

Humanitarian crisis

The 2011 Tōhoku earthquake and tsunami caused a large number of displaced people. The number of evacuees, as of 26 January 2012, was 341,411. Some earthquake survivors died in shelters or in the process of evacuation. Many shelters struggled to feed evacuees and were not sufficiently equipped medically.

Fuel shortages hampered relief actions. In the first week after the earthquake, supplies of food, water, and medicine were held up due to a fuel shortage and weather conditions. Food was limited for some unevacuated people, and as of late March, some were given one meal a day.

There was a need for temporary housing, as the Japanese government are trying to remove evacuees from large shelters, where there have been reports of poor sanitary conditions. As of late March, 8,800 temporary units were planned in Iwate, 10,000 in Miyagi, and 19,000 in Fukushima.

At the end of July 2011, the number of evacuees in Japan stood at 87,063.  Of those, 12,905 were residing in public shelters and 19,918 were staying in inns or hotels.  46,081 units of temporary housing, about 88 percent of the number planned, had been erected.  Evacuees had moved into 73 percent of the temporary housing available.

Nuclear accidents

Following the earthquake, tsunami, and failure of cooling systems at Fukushima I Nuclear Power Plant and issues concerning other nuclear facilities in Japan on 11 March 2011, a nuclear emergency was declared. This was the first time a nuclear emergency had been declared in Japan, and 140,000 residents within  of the plant were evacuated. Explosions and a fire have resulted in dangerous levels of radiation, sparking a stock market collapse and panic-buying in supermarkets. The UK, France and some other countries advised their nationals to consider leaving Tokyo, in response to fears of spreading nuclear contamination. The accidents have drawn attention to ongoing concerns over Japanese nuclear seismic design standards and caused other governments to re-evaluate their nuclear programs. As of April 2011, water is still being poured into the damaged reactors to cool melting fuel rods. John Price, a former member of the Safety Policy Unit at the UK's National Nuclear Corporation, has said that it "might be 100 years before melting fuel rods can be safely removed from Japan's Fukushima nuclear plant".

Problems in stabilizing the Fukushima I plant have hardened attitudes to nuclear power. As of June 2011, "more than 80 percent of Japanese now say they are anti-nuclear and distrust government information on radiation". The ongoing Fukushima crisis may spell the end of nuclear power in Japan, as "citizen opposition grows and local authorities refuse permission to restart reactors that have undergone safety checks". Local authorities are skeptical that sufficient safety measures have been taken and are reticent to give their permission – now required by law – to bring suspended nuclear reactors back online.

Economic impact

Japan

Following the earthquake some analysts were predicting that the total recovery costs could reach ¥10 trillion ($122 billion); however, by 12 April 2011 the Japanese government estimated that the cost of just the direct material damage could exceed ¥25 trillion ($300 billion). Japan's real gross domestic product contracted 3.7% for the quarter of January to March 2011.

The northern Tōhoku region, which was most affected, accounts for about 8% of the country's gross domestic product, with factories that manufacture products such as cars and beer, as well as energy infrastructure. The Miyagi area includes manufacturing and industrial zones with chemical and electronics plants. It is estimated that Miyagi accounts for 1.7% of Japan's gross domestic product.

An estimated 23,600 hectares of farmland, mostly rice paddies, were damaged by the tsunami. Salt left in the soil by the seawater could adversely affect rice crops for years. The affected area accounts for as much as 3%–4% of Japan's rice production. An estimated 4.37 million chickens in northeast Japan died following the earthquake as a result of disruptions in the supply of feed from overseas suppliers.

An estimated 90% of the 29,000 fishing boats in Miyagi, Iwate, and Fukushima prefectures were rendered unusable by the tsunami. Miyagi Prefecture's fishing industry was almost completely destroyed. Twelve thousand of 13,000 registered fishing boats in the prefecture were destroyed or damaged. At least 440 fishermen were killed or missing. The damage to the prefecture's fishing industry was estimated at ¥400 billion (US$5 billion). The total damage to Japan's fishing industry, in seven affected prefectures, was estimated at ¥1.26 trillion (US$11.29 billion).

The earthquake and tsunami have had significant immediate impacts on businesses such as Toyota, Nissan and Honda, which completely suspended auto production until 14 March 2011. Nippon Steel Corporation also suspended production, Toyo Tire & Rubber Company and Sumitomo Rubber Industries shuttered their tire and rubber production lines, while GS Yuasa closed its automotive battery production. This was expected to hinder supply availability for automakers.

Tokyo Electric Power Company, Toshiba, East Japan Railway Company and Shin-Etsu Chemical were suggested as the most vulnerable companies as a result of the earthquake. Sony also suspended production at all its six plants in the area, while Fuji Heavy Industries discontinued production at most of its factories in the Gunma and the Tochigi Prefectures. Other factories suspending operations include Kirin Holdings, GlaxoSmithKline, Nestlé and Toyota amid power cuts. The factory shutdowns, power cuts and the consequent presumed impact on consumer confidence could hurt the national GDP for several months, although economist Michael Boskin predicted "only minimal impact on the Japanese economy overall". Following threats of further nuclear leaks, Blackstone Group LP, Continental AG and BMW were said to be moving their staff outside Japan. Toyota planned to recommence hybrid vehicle production, including the Prius, Lexus HS, and Lexus CT, on 28 March 2011. Honda said that their two Japanese factories will remain closed until 3 April. On 24 March, Nissan said it may move some engine production to the United States due to earthquake damage in Japan. Also on 24 March, IHS Inc. automobile analyst Paul Newton predicted U.S. plants could experience parts shortages by mid-April and that automobile production worldwide could drop by 30%. Toyota expected some shutdowns in North America, but these would be temporary since many needed parts were shipped before the earthquake.

Chief economist for Japan at Credit Suisse, Hiromichi Shirakawa, said in a note to clients that the estimated economic loss may be around $171 billion–$183 billion just to the region hit by the quake and tsunami. On 14 March, the Bank of Japan, in an attempt to maintain market stability, injected 15 trillion yen into the money markets to assure financial stability amid a plunge in stocks and surge in credit risk. After it set up an emergency task force to ensure liquidity in the aftermath of the disaster, governor Masaaki Shirakawa and the bank's board also enlarged a programme to buy government bonds to exchange-traded funds to the tune of 10 trillion yen. The BOJ chief told reporters cash injections will continue as needed. However, following the further nuclear leaks, its actions were read by the market as insufficient despite 8 trillion yen being pumped into the market. On 15 March, the Topix index fell again marking a two-day plunge not seen since 1987 as Japan's default risk surged after Prime Minister Naoto Kan warned of further leaks from the damaged nuclear power plant. Commodities were also significantly lower. Residents of Tokyo were reported to have gone on panic shopping sprees as daily necessities were sought after and gasoline was stocked up with the increasing risk of radioactivity releases.

Chief Cabinet Secretary Yukio Edano said that Japan's government will convene on 13 March to gauge the economic effects of the catastrophe. He told NHK Television that about 200 billion yen that was remaining from the budget for the concurrent fiscal year that would end on 31 March would be used to fund the immediate recovery efforts. Additional measures could also hurt Japan's public debt (which is already the highest in the world). This additional spending could hurt demand for government bonds.

Silicon wafer production has been suspended at factories owned by Shin-Etsu Chemical and MEMC Electronic Materials, which together account for 25% of the global silicon wafer production. The suspension is expected to drastically impact semiconductor production, which is contingent on wafer availability.

Some economic analysts consider that, ultimately, the catastrophe will improve Japan's economy, with increased job availability during restoration efforts. An analyst at JPMorgan Chase, citing the 1989 Loma Prieta earthquake in the San Francisco Bay Area and the Southern California 1994 Northridge earthquake, noted that natural disasters "do eventually boost output". An analyst at Société Générale anticipated that Japan's economy will decline in March 2011 but will revive powerfully in subsequent months. After the Kobe earthquake, industrial output dropped 2.6%, but increased by 2.2% the next month and 1% the following month. Japan's economy then accelerated substantially through the next two years, at more than its former rate. Others are of the opinion that the catastrophe will harm the economy. Some analysts have argued that those who predict that the reconstruction effort could help Japan's economy have fallen prey to the broken window fallacy. On 24 March, an executive of Bank of Japan's Osaka branch said he expected "a big decline in production, [leading to] an adjustment in the economy initially with exports and inventories falling and imports rising... Demand created by reconstruction projects will emerge after that." The government said that reconstruction in the ongoing year could raise GDP by 5 trillion yen to 7.75 trillion yen.

By the end of July 2011, 47 percent of the 22.63 million tons of debris in Iwate, Miyagi, and Fukushima Prefectures had been removed. By 11 July 2011, 73.7% of farming businesses affected by the quake and tsunami in eight prefectures had resumed operations while 35.5% of fishing entities had returned to business, according to the Japanese agricultural ministry. The ministry excluded Fukushima from the results because of the ongoing nuclear crisis.

The reconstruction of damaged areas in Tōhoku beginning in 2011 produced a boom in construction jobs and business in the area. As a result, cities like Sendai benefited from an increase in residents and wages for construction-related jobs rose.

By March 2012, 644 companies in Japan had been forced into bankruptcy by the disaster.  The companies included 157 service companies, 150 manufacturers, and 113 wholesalers. The companies left behind liabilities of ¥925.4 billion (US$8 billion) and had employed 11,412 people.

Global financial impact
In the immediate aftermath of the earthquake, Japan's Nikkei stock market index saw its futures slide 5% in after-market trading. The Bank of Japan said that it would do its utmost to ensure financial market stability. On Tuesday, 15 March, news of rising radiation levels caused the Nikkei to drop over 1,000 points or 10.6% (16% for the week).

Other stock markets around the world were also affected; the German DAX lost 1.2% within minutes. Hong Kong's Hang Seng index fell by 1.8%, while South Korea's Kospi index slumped by 1.3%. By the end of trading on the day of the earthquake, the MSCI Asia Pacific Index had dropped by 1.8%. Major U.S. stock market indexes rose between 0.5% and 0.7%. Oil prices also dropped as a result of the closure of Japanese refineries, despite the ongoing violence in Libya and expected demonstrations in Saudi Arabia. US crude dropped as low as US$99.01 from $100.08 by lunchtime, with Brent Crude falling $2.62 to $112.81. In Hong Kong, Financial Secretary John Tsang warned investors to "take extra care" as the earthquake may have a short-term impact on local stock markets.

The share prices of the biggest reinsurance companies Munich Re and Swiss Reinsurance Company fell following the earthquake on speculation that they may face losses "somewhere in the $10 billion range" even after certain costs were absorbed by Japan's primary insurers and the government.

The Japanese yen soared against most major currencies following the earthquake and reached a post-World War II high of 76.25 yen to the US dollar on speculation that Japanese investors would repatriate assets to pay for rebuilding. Since Japan relies heavily on exports, the strong yen could dampen its economy further. The financial markets' instability prompted the G7 to meet on 17 March, resulting in an agreement on joint forex intervention to sell yen against the dollar; it was the first such move since 2000.

Peter Bradford, a former member of the United States' Nuclear Regulatory Commission, said that the impact on the nuclear power plant was "obviously a significant setback for the so-called nuclear renaissance. The image of a nuclear power plant blowing up before your eyes on a television screen is a first."

Response in Japan

Government

Then Prime Minister Naoto Kan announced that the government had mobilized the Japan Self-Defense Forces in earthquake disaster zones. He asked the Japanese public to act calmly and tune into media for updated information. He reported that numerous nuclear power plants were automatically shut down to prevent damage and releases of radioactivity. He set up emergency headquarters in his office to coordinate the government's response.

Evacuation shelters faced a shortage of potable water, food, blankets and bathroom facilities, as the government arranged these necessities to be delivered to where they were needed from areas of Japan and abroad. Dropping temperatures, due to the disruption in electrical and gas lines, caused further problems at shelters. , 336,521 people in Japan had been displaced from their homes and were residing elsewhere, including in 2,367 shelters.

A Japanese urban search and rescue team sent to New Zealand following the February 2011 Christchurch earthquake was recalled. On 27 March 2011, Japan's National Police Agency reported that 14 of its officers had died in the line of duty in the disaster and a further 16 were missing.

The government in Japan committed to cleaning up the damage from the disaster, an effort forecast to cost a total of ¥1 trillion (US$8 billion).

The Council submitted the first set of recommendations to the government for the third supplementary budget for full-fledged reconstruction measures on 25 June. The government struggled to produce a plan for the clean up of the 2.8 million tons of debris in Fukushima Prefecture, as much of it is radioactive.

Many seaside communities in Japan have reexamined their tsunami defenses and reaction plans in response to the disaster.

The public and companies were encouraged to conserve electricity in the 2011 summer months (Setsuden).

In March 2012 the Tokyo Metropolitan Government passed the Metropolitan Tokyo Ordinance on Measures for Stranded Individuals requiring employers to stockpile food, water and emergency supplies at their places of business. It came into effect on 1 April 2013.

Japanese media reported in 2012 that up to 25% of special funds allocated by the government for disaster recovery and relief were being used outside the disaster area on projects unrelated to the earthquake and tsunami.  The projects included ¥500 million (US$4 million) for road construction in Okinawa, ¥330 million (US$3 million) for repairs to National Stadium, ¥10.7 million (US$95 thousand) in subsidies for nuclear research, ¥30 million (US$269 thousand) for power shovels for prisons in Hokkaido and Saitama, and ¥2.3 billion (US$20 million) to combat the Sea Shepherd Conservation Society.  In the meantime, in October 2012 the damaged towns in Tōhoku reported that they were still struggling to recover from the disaster.

National Diet Library 

Efforts by the National Diet Library were deployed toward the preservation of archival material related to the Great East Japan Earthquake. In 10 May 2011, a panel of experts published its Seven Principles for the Reconstruction Framework, with the first principle pressing the need to construct permanent memory of the natural disaster. In response, many municipal government put in place disaster archives. In July 2011, the Japanese government published its Basic Guidelines for Reconstruction in Response to the Great East Japan Earthquake and made a commitment in providing full access to its collected disaster records.

This commitment led to the creation of the National Diet Library Great East Japan Archives, otherwise known as HINAGIKU, in March 2013. The database is the main repository for archival material related to the 2011 disasters and is also a hub for disaster records collected by various other municipalities and for records relating to other Japanese natural disasters. It provides access to more than 3,7 million records related to earthquakes and other natural disasters in Japan (notably the Kumamoto Earthquake). The records consist of reports, photographs, scientific papers, and many others.

However, the content hosted by HINAGIKU might partly be in jeopardy. Indeed, considering the fact that many of the disaster archives that were built during the early months succeeding May 2011 entirely depended on temporary funds, many of those archives might close someday. This would mean that disaster records would have to be taken in charge by the National Diet Library or another archival repository in order to keep them available; however it is unsure how this would be done at the moment. Another pressing issue is metadata harmonization, whereas not all archival repositories curate their disaster records with the same standards. This might hinder findings in HINAGIKU.

Citizens

There was a notable lack of disorder immediately following the earthquake. This was attributed to Japanese forbearance, an attitude sometimes referred to as gaman, and to laws that encourage honesty and a strong police presence. One source reported that the three main clans of Yakuza gangs were enforcing order in their territories. A Mark MacKinnon wrote in The Globe and Mail wrote, "As one catastrophe piled on top of another, a very Japanese deference to authority emerged, as well as a national desire to see civility prevail, no matter the circumstances."

Some people devastated by the quake began, however, to question the government's effort in providing food, clothing, electricity, heat, and phone service. Chief Cabinet Secretary Yukio Edano later said, "In hindsight, we could have moved a little quicker in assessing the situation and coordinating all that information and provided it faster."

Some ten days after the quake, reports began to emerge of incidents of looting and theft in quake and tsunami-hit areas. By 20 March 2011, 250 thefts, with ¥4.9 million (US$43 thousand) in merchandise stolen from stores and ¥5.8 million (US$52 thousand) in cash, were reported to the Miyagi Prefectural Police. Witnesses reported thieves stealing cash and bank books from smashed houses, looting goods from stores, and siphoning gas from abandoned or damaged vehicles. Around ¥40 million (US$358 thousand) was reportedly stolen from a bank in Kesennuma, Miyagi.

Between 11 March and the end of June 2011, a total of ¥684.4 million (US$6 million) was stolen from ATMs and convenience stores in Fukushima, Miyagi, and Iwate prefectures. Of the money stolen, ¥477 million (US$4 million) from 34 ATM thefts took place in Fukushima Prefecture, 80% of that in the 20-km evacuation zone around the Daiichi nuclear plant. The number of thefts from homes and stores during the same period in those three prefectures stood at 1,233, about 1.5 times the number from the same period in 2010. Of them, 194 were in the nuclear evacuation zone, 19 times the number from 2010. The rumors which had spread immediately after the quake of rampant rapes by armed gangs proved to be false, as reports of sexual assaults actually fell 35.7 percent to 81 cases. Only one sexual assault was reported occurring in one of the evacuee centers. Throughout Japan, there were 51 reported cases of scams or frauds related to the disaster, with losses amounting to around ¥12.6 million (US$112 thousand).

Even though there are no regulations imposed by the Japan government for conservation, many people practised self-restraint by conserving resources and cancelling celebrations, this reaction was attributed by experts as a way of coping with the traumatising scale of losses and the spreading fear of radioactive fallout.

As of December 2011, there were 2,439 complaints lodged with the National Consumer Affairs Center of Japan concerning earthquake-related scams from throughout Japan. A total of ¥970 million had been paid or lost by those targeted by the alleged scams. The reported scams included exorbitant house and roof repairs, faulty radiation gauges, and water filters touted to remove radioactivity.

The government raised the level 7 severity of the nuclear accident after the 2011 Japanese unified regional elections.

Non-government organizations, including Peace Boat, have assisted in cleaning up the disaster area since the quake.

Non-citizen residents of Japan
Approximately 531,000 non-Japanese residing in Japan departed the country after the quake and tsunami, including approximately 25% of foreigners living in Tokyo. Foreigners living in Japan and the English-language media in Japan coined the term "flyjin" (or fly-jin), a play on the Japanese word gaijin, as a label for the non-Japanese who fled in the wake of the disaster.

9,720 dependents of United States military and government civilian employees in Japan fled the country, mainly to the United States. The United States spent $11.7 million on chartered aircraft to fly the dependents out of the country.

The number of foreign residents in Japan dropped by 55,000 in 2011, with Iwate losing 15.5%, Fukushima 15.1%, and Miyagi 13.2% of their populations of non-Japanese. The total reduction in foreigners nationwide was 2.6% of the pre-quake total.

Media

The former Japanese participant of Korean Broadcasting System's Global Talk Show Junko Sagawa criticized the Japanese government for "intentionally ignoring the Japanese citizens during the tsunami and the nuclear crisis" through her personal homepage on 17 March 2011.

The earthquake postponed the analog shutdown in the Iwate, Miyagi, and Fukushima prefectures. Television stations in these three prefectures shut off their analog signals on 31 March 2012 at noon. Television stations in the Yamagata, Aomori, and Akita prefectures shut down their analog signals on 24 July 2011, along with the rest of Japan.

International response

Request for assistance
Japan specifically requested teams from Australia, New Zealand, South Korea, and the United States; it also requested, via its space agency JAXA, the activation of the International Charter on Space and Major Disasters, allowing diverse satellite imagery of affected regions to be readily shared with rescue and aid organizations.

World involvement
Japan received messages of condolence and offers of assistance from a range of international leaders. According to Japan's foreign ministry on 19 March 2011, 128 countries and 33 international organizations had offered assistance to Japan.
Several countries, including Australia, China, India, New Zealand, South Korea, and the United States, sent search-and-rescue teams, and dozens of other countries and major international relief organizations such as the Red Cross and Red Crescent pledged financial and material support to Japan.
The EU has also been more than ready to offer its support to them: "An earthquake powerful enough to make the world wobble on its axis, a massive tsunami, an emergency in nuclear power stations. Any one of these would be a tragedy. Thousands of people have died and this has turned this tragedy into a catastrophe," said Herman van Rompuy, President of the European Council. Twenty Member States have offered assistance through the European Civil Protection Mechanism. Australian Prime Minister Julia Gillard was the first foreign leader to visit the earthquake site.

The Fukushima incident brought the issue of nuclear power to the fore internationally, causing an anti-nuclear demonstration of 50,000 people in Stuttgart and the cancellation of a pro-nuclear press conference in the United Kingdom.

While stepping-up monitoring of radiation levels on its own shores in face of the Fukushima nuclear power plant crisis, China, a major supporter in the relief operations in Japan in spite of its own current earthquake crisis, had officially begun evacuating its citizens from those worst-hit areas in Japan on 15 March 2011. France had also officially begun evacuation of its nationals from the worst-hit areas, dispatching airliners to assist in the evacuation on 16 March 2011.

In many countries, both government and private aid campaigns have been organized to offer money and support to the victims and general populace of Japan. Social buying sites have launched on-line campaigns in which several million dollars were raised for relief organizations working in Japan.  
As of 3 April 2011, the Japanese Red Cross had received over $1 billion in donations in response to the disaster, and dispatched more than 200 emergency relief teams to the disaster zone. However it received criticism from some quarters for not yet having dispensed any cash aid to survivors. The American Red Cross said that it had received $120 million in donations from the US public. The Singapore Red Cross and Japan Association said that, as of 31 March 2011, residents of Singapore had donated S$ 3.15 million for disaster relief.

As of May 2011, contributors in South Korea had donated ₩56 billion won (US$50 million) to various organizations for the disaster relief effort. By May 2011 the people of Taiwan had donated or pledged 5.9 billion Taiwan dollars (US$216 million).

Operation Tomodachi, which means Friend in Japanese, was the United States military operation to provide assistance and humanitarian aid to Japan. Twenty-thousand US military personnel, including 19 naval vessels and 120 aircraft, were mobilized to provide assistance or move supplies to the disaster area.  The US aid efforts were conducted under the direction of Japanese government or military authorities. The Yomiuri Shimbun reported that the "coordinated relief activities at the disaster sites are expected to deepen the Japan-U.S. alliance."

A number of religious groups donated funds, equipment, supplies, or volunteer time.  The Hinokishin Brigade of Tenrikyo donated ¥920 million, Sōka Gakkai ¥500 million, Risshō Kōsei Kai ¥500 million, Seicho-no-Ie ¥250 million, Unification Church ¥160 million, Science of Happiness ¥61 million, and various other Buddhist charities ¥340 million.

Information and support
Among several resources offered to help find earthquake survivors and obtain information about people in Japan are: Disaster Message Board Web171 operated by Nippon Telegraph and Telephone, the International Committee of the Red Cross, American Red Cross, Google Person Finder, websites of the Australian Embassy, US Department of State, UK Foreign and Commonwealth Office, and the Honshū Quake wiki operated by the CrisisCommons volunteer community. On 27 March 2013, Google released street view imagery for the city of Namie within the exclusion zone, following requests from former residents.

Sports
At the time of the earthquake, a Nippon Professional Baseball preseason game between Sendai's Tohoku Rakuten Golden Eagles and the Hanshin Tigers in Akashi, Hyōgo was cancelled after the eighth inning so the Eagles players and personnel could check on the safety of their friends and families in the area. The opening of the 2011 season was postponed until April 12, and Rakuten continued to train in the Kansai region because of the damage sustained by Sendai and Kleenex Stadium. In addition to the Eagles holding fund-raising events, all 12 NPB teams played charity games between April 3 to 4 to help raise money for earthquake relief. Rakuten opened the season at QVC Marine Field against the Marines and fans displaced by the earthquake were able to watch the Eagles' come-from-behind win on large screens the team set up at 20 refuge sites in Tōhoku. Days later, they hosted their first "home" game at Koshien Stadium while the restoration work to Kleenex Stadium continued. The earthquake had damaged 47 different parts of the stadium, including its lights and outside walls. Baseball returned to Sendai on April 12, when the Eagles played their first game at their home field. An opening ceremony attended by the governor of Miyagi Prefecture Yoshihiro Murai and United States Ambassador John Roos was held before the game and Rakuten went on to win. To save electricity, a rule was put into place that season that required games to stop three and a half hours after the start of the game. The earthquake also caused the 2011 Japan Series between the Fukuoka SoftBank Hawks and Chunichi Dragons to be delayed into mid-November due to the season opening being delayed.

The 2011 World Figure Skating Championships were scheduled to take place from 21–27 March at the Yoyogi National Gymnasium in Tokyo but the International Skating Union decided on 14 March to postpone the event, after the German team announced that it would follow recommendations not to travel to Japan.
After Japanese officials announced it would not be possible to host the event in the country, it was moved to late April in Moscow, Russia. The 2011 ISU World Team Trophy in Figure Skating, scheduled for Yokohama on 14–17 April, was postponed until the following year.

The Japanese Olympic Committee denied reports that it had abandoned plans to bid for the 2020 Olympics and said it was still under consideration. In April 2011, Japanese Olympic officials stated they were undecided whether to run but said hosting international sports events was important to helping the country rebuild. In July 2011, Tokyo put forth its bid to host the 2020 Summer Olympic Games. Following the deadline for bidding, the IOC confirmed that Tokyo was one of the six cities that had entered a bid. The bid has received the full support of the government. On 23 May 2012, the IOC selected Tokyo as one of the three candidate cities for the 2020 Olympics. On 7 September 2013, Tokyo was voted to host the 2020 Summer Olympics with 60 votes to 36 in the final round against Istanbul.

The 2011 Japanese motorcycle Grand Prix, originally scheduled for 24 April, was moved to 2 October.

18 September IndyCar race at Motegi, Japan, the Indy Japan Final, was moved from the Superspeedway to the Road Course because of damage to the Superspeedway (2.5 kilometres oval) to the 4.7 km road course, and reduced from 482 miles to 300 km.

The 2011 Asia League Ice Hockey finals between the Tōhoku Free Blades and Anyang Halla were to begin on 11 March but the five games were canceled. , no rescheduled dates were announced.

The Japan national football team canceled their friendly match with Montenegro scheduled for 25 March in Shizuoka. They were also scheduled to play New Zealand in Tokyo on 29 March, although the Japan Football Association tried to relocate the match to Osaka, much further away from the affected area. "We hope to play New Zealand, which like Japan has also suffered damage from a big earthquake," Japan FA president Junji Ogura said in a statement. In the end, the "All Whites" canceled their plans to play the Japanese due to safety concerns.

The ITF tennis tournament, Japan Future 1, was to take place on Nishitama District, Tokyo from 14–20 March and was cancelled after the qualifying round was completed. The series of four ITF Men's Circuit Futures tournaments in and around Tokyo, commencing the week of 14 March 2011 has been cancelled.

Due to uncertainty over the nuclear situation, the International Federation of Gymnastics was considering moving the 2011 World Artistic Gymnastics Championships, however they went ahead as planned.

The Japan women's national football team originally sought to pull out from the 2011 FIFA Women's World Cup due to the devastating earthquake which caused the cancellation of the Nadeshiko League, but ultimately didn't. Eventually, the Japanese Nadeshiko went on to win the tournament, losing only one game in the process. Their run was hailed as a one of the greatest upsets in a major football competition. After winning, the team raised a banner to thank their fans for supporting them following its victory in the 2011 FIFA Women's World Cup Final.

Debris overseas
On 21 September 2012, the National Oceanic and Atmospheric Administration announced that a large blue plastic storage bin from Fukushima was the first confirmed piece of marine debris that had arrived in waters off Hawaii. This was the 12th confirmed piece of Japanese tsunami debris to arrive in United States or Canadian waters.

On 30 November 2012, Prime Minister Noda announced the Government of Japan had decided to extend an ex gratia gift to the government of the United States in the wake of the Great East Japan earthquake to demonstrate goodwill with respect to tsunami debris.

During March 2013, a boat lost during the tsunami washed up on the shores of Washington, U.S. carrying five trapped live fish. The surviving Tsunami fish was put on display at the Seaside Aquarium. Between September 2015 and March 2016, 64 items that have washed up on the coastline of North America have been identified as being debris from the tsunami.

Asteroid naming
Multiple asteroid have been named in relations to the earthquake. In the Asteroids, Comets, Meteors 2012 conference which was held at Toki Messe in Niigata, International Astronomical Union approved naming 12 asteroids after areas affected by the earthquake, in hopes for their recovery. The 12 asteroids, including 14701 Aizu, 19534 Miyagi, 19691 Iwate, 19701 Aomori, 19713 Ibaraki, 19731 Tochigi, 20613 Chibaken, 21966 Hamadori, 22719 Nakadori, 22745 Rikuzentakata, 22885 Sakaemura, and 22914 Tsunanmachi were all discovered by Lowell Observatory in the Lowell Observatory Near-Earth-Object Search project, which have the right to propose the naming of these asteroids and is officially the proposer of these names, although the naming proposal itself was initially drafts by local organizing committee for the conference.

The asteroid 23649 Tohoku is also named after the area affected by the earthquake to commemorate all the people died during the disaster, asteroid 29157 Higashinihon is named as such in hope for recovery from the earthquake, and asteroid 31152 Daishinsai is also named after the earthquake to commemorate the event and wish for people died from its.

See also
 Hideaki Akaiwa
 Ryou-Un Maru

References

External links
 Great East Japan Earthquake Official Portal
 Reconstruction Design Council in Response to the Great East Japan Earthquake
 Japan's economic outlook following the 11 March 2011 Earthquake
 Health Implications in the Aftermath of Japan's Crisis: Mental Health, Radiation Risks, and the Importance of Continued Surveillance
 2015 News on Nuclear power plant re-opening schedules.

2011 in Japan
2011 Tōhoku earthquake and tsunami
2011 in international relations
Tohoku